Blue Hills may refer to:

Places
 Blue Hills, Queensland, a locality in the City of Townsville, Australia
 Sinimäed Hills (or "Blue Hills"), Estonia
 Blue Hills, Gauteng, a suburb of Johannesburg, South Africa
 Blue Hills, Turks and Caicos Islands, the highest point of the islands

United States 
 Blue Hills (Washington), a range of hills
 Blue Hills, Connecticut, a suburb of Hartford
 Blue Hills, Kansas City, Missouri
 Blue Hills Reservation, Massachusetts, a state park
 Blue Hills Ski Area
 Great Blue Hill, the highest point in the reservation

Other uses
 The Blue Hills (Estonian: Sinimäed), a 2006 Estonian film
 Blue Hills (radio serial), an Australian radio serial, run from 1949 until 1976, formerly named The Lawsons
 "Blue Hills of Massachusetts", the official poem of the Commonwealth of Massachusetts by Katherine E. Mullen
 Battle of Blue Hills, a 1944 battle between the German Army and the Soviet Leningrad Front

See also
 Big Blue Hills, a mountain range in Fresno County, California
 Blue Hill (disambiguation)